HLA class II histocompatibility antigen, DO beta chain is a protein that in humans is encoded by the HLA-DOB gene.

HLA-DOB belongs to the HLA class II beta chain paralogues. This class II molecule is a heterodimer consisting of an alpha (DOA) and a beta chain (DOB), both anchored in the membrane. It is located in intracellular vesicles. DO suppresses peptide loading of MHC class II molecules by inhibiting HLA-DM. Class II molecules are expressed in antigen presenting cells (APC: B lymphocytes, dendritic cells, macrophages). The beta chain is approximately 26-28 kDa and its gene contains 6 exons. Exon one encodes the leader peptide, exons 2 and 3 encode the two extracellular domains, exon 4 encodes the transmembrane domain and exon 5 encodes the cytoplasmic tail.

References

Further reading

MHC class II